Valley Township is one of the sixteen townships of Scioto County, Ohio, United States.  The 2010 census counted 3,874 people in the township.

Geography
Located in the northern part of the county, it borders the following townships:
Scioto Township, Pike County - north
Union Township, Pike County - northeast corner
Jefferson Township - east
Clay Township - south
Rush Township - southwest
Morgan Township - west
Camp Creek Township, Pike County - northwest corner

No municipalities are located in Valley Township, although the census-designated place of Lucasville is located in the center of the township.

Name and history
Statewide, the only other Valley Township is located in Guernsey County.

Valley Township was organized June 4, 1860. The township was named for the valley of the Scioto River.

Government
The township is governed by a three-member board of trustees, who are elected in November of odd-numbered years to a four-year term beginning on the following January 1. Two are elected in the year after the presidential election and one is elected in the year before it. There is also an elected township fiscal officer, who serves a four-year term beginning on April 1 of the year after the election, which is held in November of the year before the presidential election. Vacancies in the fiscal officership or on the board of trustees are filled by the remaining trustees.

Ohio Department of Corrections Southern Ohio Correctional Facility is partly in the township.

References

External links
Township website
County website

Townships in Scioto County, Ohio
Townships in Ohio